Pafawag (Państwowa Fabryka Wagonów) (English: National Rail Carriage Factory) is a Polish locomotive manufacturer based in Wrocław. The company became part of Adtranz in 1997 as Adtranz Pafawag, and in 2001 part of Bombardier Transportation. It is now part of the company Alstom

History
The factory opened in 1833 as Linke-Hofmann-Werke, Breslau, and became one of the major production centres for rolling stock in Europe.

By the end of the Second World War most of the factory had been destroyed, and after the War the city of Breslau became part of Poland. 

In 1953 the company was renamed Pafawag.

In 1953 the company produced the EP-02, the first Polish electric locomotive manufactured after World War II.

In the late 1980s to mid 1990s the company experienced increasing economic problems due to lack of orders causing loss of production and lower employment.

In 1997 ABB DaimlerBenz Transportation (ADtranz) acquired a majority share in the company. The Adtranz group (DaimlerChrysler Rail Systems after 1999) was bought by Bombardier Transportation in 2001;  the Wroclaw plant was merged with another Bombardier owned plant based in Łódź to form Bombardier Transportation Polska Sp. z o.o. The plant manufactures the bodyshells of Bombardier locomotives as well as other sub-components for the Bombardier Transportation group.

In 2015 Bombardier contracted Panattoni Europe to construct an additional  manufacturing hall, initially to be used for the construction of Deutsche Bahn's ICx trains.

Products

The main products:
 locomotives,
 bodies,
 frames,
 running gear for locomotives.

Pafawag was the producer of first Polish modern "fast locomotive" EP09 .

Pafawag types

Adtranz-Pafawag types

See also
Linke-Hofmann

References

External links 

  History of Linke-Hofmann-Werke (in German)

 
Locomotive manufacturers of Poland
Rail vehicle manufacturers of Poland
Companies based in Wrocław
Manufacturing companies established in 1833
1833 establishments in Poland